Osbaldeston is a surname. Notable people with the surname include:
 
Edward Osbaldeston, (c. 1560–1594), Catholic martyr
George Osbaldeston, (1786–1866), cricketer
Gordon Osbaldeston, (born 1930), Canadian civil servant
Lambert Osbaldeston, (1594–1659), headmaster of Westminster School
Nancy Osbaldeston (born 1989), English ballet dancer
Richard Osbaldeston, (1691–1764), Bishop of London

See also
Osbaldeston baronets